The 2009–11 International Challenge Trophy was the third edition of the International Challenge Trophy. Originally, 12 teams were expected to enter the competition. Hungary, however, withdrew before any draw was made. The draw for the competition took place on 28 August 2009 in Dublin. Teams were placed into three groups, two of four teams and one of three. The three group winners and the best runner up then qualified for the semi-finals. Portugal eventually emerged as the winners after defeating England C in the final.

Group A

Matches

Final table

Group B

Matches

Final table

Group C

Matches

Final table

Knock-out stage

Semi-finals

Final

References

International Challenge Trophy
Challenge Trophy
Challenge Trophy